The Fjæra Tunnel is a road tunnel in Etne municipality in Vestland county, Norway. The tunnel was built in 1992 to replace the narrow, winding road that ran between the shore of the Åkrafjorden and the base of the steep mountains.

References

Etne
Road tunnels in Vestland